Itala Pellegrino (born 1865) was an Italian painter; she mainly painted genre and seascapes.

Biography
Born in Milan, she was a resident of Naples. She studied painting with professor Domenico Battaglia. At the 1881 Exposition of Turin, and to that of Milan, she sent seascapes.  In 1888 at Naples she exhibited Marina di Portici. At Rome in 1880, exhibited a genre painting titled: Frusta là!. Among her works are: Marina dì Napoli: Nel golfo: Sera nel mare; and Tempo sereno.

References

1865 births
Year of death missing
19th-century Italian painters
19th-century Italian women artists
Italian women painters
Italian landscape painters
Painters from Naples